United Party of Canada may refer to:

 United Party (1983), a short-lived party established by perennial candidate Anne McBride
 United Party of Canada (2009)
 United Party of Canada (2018)